Paolo Flores d'Arcais (born in Cervignano del Friuli, on 11 July 1944) is an Italian philosopher and journalist, editor of the magazine MicroMega. He contributes to Il Fatto Quotidiano, El País, Frankfurter Allgemeine Zeitung and Gazeta Wyborcza.

Philosophers who have influenced his work include Albert Camus and Hannah Arendt.

He was one of the main promoters of the Italian girotondi movement in 2002.

Bibliography

Opere di Paolo Flores d'Arcais
 Esistenza e libertà : a partire da Hannah Arendt. Genova, Marietti, 1990. 
 Etica senza fede. Torino, Einaudi, 1992. 
 L' individuo libertario: percorsi di filosofia morale e politica nell'orizzonte del finito. Torino, Einaudi, 1999. 
 Il sovrano e il dissidente (Garzanti, 2004)
 Il ventennio populista. Da Craxi a Berlusconi (passando per D'Alema?). Fazi, 2006. 
 Hannah Arendt. Esistenza e libertà, autenticità e politica (Fazi, 2006)

External links
 MicroMega official site
 Article Undici riflessioni sui movimenti (MicroMega 2/2002).

1944 births
Living people
People from Cervignano del Friuli
20th-century Italian philosophers
21st-century Italian philosophers
Italian magazine editors
Italian columnists
Italian male journalists
20th-century Italian male writers